Top Model po-russki, cycle 2 was the second installment of the Russian adaptation of Tyra Banks America's Next Top Model. The show aired on Muz-TV from September to November 2011. Host Ksenia Sobchak and Inna Zobova returned as judges, but Elena Suprun and Mikhail Korolev were replaced by stylist, fashion designer and TV presenter Vlad Lisovets, and male model Danila Polyakov.

The prize package for this cycle included a fashion spread in Cosmopolitan magazine as well as a cover appearance in Cosmopolitan Shopping, a contract with Max Factor, and a modelling contract.

The winner of the competition was 18-year-old Katya Bagrova from Nizhny Novgorod.

Cast

Contestants

(Ages stated are at start of contest)

Judges
 Ksenia Sobchak (host)
 Vlad Lisovets
 Danila Polyakov
 Inna Zobova

Episodes

Episode 1 
Original Airdate: September 25, 2011

Episode 2 
Original Airdate: September 25, 2011
Featured photographer: Natalie Arefyeva
Special guests: Daniel Kosenkov

Episode 3 

Original Airdate: October 2, 2011

Featured photographer: Enisey Abramov 
Special guests: Vladimir Kalinchev

Episode 4 

Original Airdate: October 2, 2011

Featured photographer: Alikhan 
Special guests: Evgeniy Papunaishvili

Episode 5 
Original Airdate: October 9, 2011

Featured photographer: Alexey Nikishin

Episode 6 

Original Airdate: October 9, 2011
 
Featured photographer: Nigel Barker
Special guests: Nigel Barker

Episode 7 

Original Airdate: October 16, 2011

Featured photographer: Alexey Yakovlev
Special guests: Masha Tsigal

Episode 8 

Original Airdate: October 16, 2011

Featured photographer: Dmitry Pirozhnikov
Special guests: Alya Badanina, Natasha Poly

Episode 9 

Original Airdate: October 23, 2011

Episode 10 

Original Airdate: October 23, 2011

Featured photographer: Phys Frampton
Special guests: Sophie Ellis-Bextor

Episode 11 

Original Airdate: October 30, 2011
  
Featured photographer: Rita
Special guests: Sasha Boyer

Episode 12 

Original Airdate: October 30, 2011

Featured photographer: Joseph Sinclair
Special guests: Prince Cassius

Episode 13 
Original Airdate: November 6, 2011

 Special guests: Vladimir Kalinchev

Episode 14 
Original Airdate: November 6, 2011

Featured photographer: Clara Maidment
Special guests: Alya Badanina

Results

 The contestant was eliminated
 The contestant was eliminated outside of judging panel
 The contestant quit the competition
 The contestant was the original eliminee but was saved
 The contestant was put through collectively to the next round
 The contestant won the competition

 Episode 1 was the casting episode.
 In episode 6, Nastya was eliminated outside of judging panel. 
 In episode 7, Dobromira was the original eliminee, but was saved due to Vera's decision to quit the competition. 
 Episode 9 was the recap episode.
 In episode 13, there was no call-out. Olga was eliminated immediately after the final three deliberation, while Katya and Yulya advanced to the final two.

Shoots guide

 Episode 1 photo shoot (casting): Portraying pirates
Episode 2 photo shoot: On the beach for Gillette Venus
Episode 3 photo shoot: Beauty shots for MaxFactor
Episode 4 photo shoot: Angels
Episode 5 photo shoot: Circus

References

Top Model series (Russia)
2011 Russian television seasons